John VIII Palaiologos or Palaeologus (18 December 1392 – 31 October 1448) was the penultimate Byzantine emperor, ruling from 1425 to 1448.

Biography
John VIII was the eldest son of Manuel II Palaiologos and Helena Dragaš, the daughter of the Serbian prince Constantine Dragaš.  He was associated as co-emperor with his father before 1416 and became sole emperor on 1 July 1425, although he had already assumed full power on 19 January 1421.

In June 1422, John VIII Palaiologos supervised the defense of Constantinople during a siege by Murad II, but had to accept the loss of Thessalonica, which his brother Andronikos had given to Venice in 1423. To secure protection against the Ottomans, he made two journeys to Italy in 1423 and 1439. During the second journey he visited Pope Eugene IV in Ferrara and consented to the union of the Greek and Roman churches. The union was ratified at the Council of Florence in 1439, which John attended with 700 followers including Patriarch Joseph II of Constantinople and George Gemistos Plethon, a Neoplatonist philosopher influential among the academics of Italy. The union failed due to opposition in Constantinople, but through his prudent conduct towards the Ottoman Empire he succeeded in holding possession of the city.

John VIII Palaiologos named his brother Constantine XI, who had served as regent in Constantinople in 1437–1439, as his successor. Despite the machinations of his younger brother Demetrios Palaiologos his mother Helena was able to secure Constantine XI's succession in 1448.

John VIII died at Constantinople in 1448, becoming the last reigning Byzantine emperor to die of natural causes, and was buried in the Pantokrator Monastery.

Marriages
John VIII Palaiologos was married three times. His first marriage was in 1414 to Anna of Moscow, daughter of Grand Prince Basil I of Moscow (1389–1425) and Sophia of Lithuania. She died in August 1417 of plague.

The second marriage, arranged by his father Manuel II and Pope Martin V, was to Sophia of Montferrat in 1421. She was a daughter of Theodore II, Marquess of Montferrat, and his second wife Joanna of Bar. Joanna was a daughter of Robert I, Duke of Bar, and Marie de Valois. Her maternal grandparents were John II of France and Bonne of Bohemia.

His third marriage, arranged by the future cardinal, Bessarion, was to Maria of Trebizond in 1427. She was a daughter of Alexios IV of Trebizond and Theodora Kantakouzene. She died in the winter of 1439, also from plague. None of the marriages produced any children.

Representation in art
John VIII Palaiologos was famously depicted by several painters on the occasion of his visit to Italy. Perhaps the most famous of his portraits is the one by Benozzo Gozzoli, on the southern wall of the Magi Chapel, at the Palazzo Medici-Riccardi, in Florence. According to some interpretations, John VIII would be also portrayed in Piero della Francesca's Flagellation.  A portrait of John appears in a manuscript at the Saint Catherine's Monastery in the Sinai Peninsula.

Gallery

Ancestry

See also

List of Byzantine emperors

References

Sources

Further reading
 Harris, Jonathan, The End of Byzantium. New Haven and London: Yale University Press, 2010. 
 Kolditz, Sebastian, Johannes VIII. Palaiologos und das Konzil von Ferrara-Florenz (1438/39). 2 Vol., Stuttgart: Anton Hiersemann Verlag 2013–2014, .
 Lazaris, Stavros, "L’empereur Jean VIII Paléologue vu par Pisanello lors du concile de Ferrare – Florence", Byzantinische Forschungen, 29, 2007, p. 293-324 
 

1392 births
1448 deaths
John 08
Converts to Eastern Catholicism from Eastern Orthodoxy
Greek Eastern Catholics
Former Greek Orthodox Christians
John 08
Byzantine people of the Byzantine–Ottoman wars
Sons of Byzantine emperors